Selection Day is an Indian sports drama streaming television series, based on Aravind Adiga's 2016 novel of the same name. Produced by Anil Kapoor and Anand Tucker, and adapted for television by Marston Bloom (with Hindi Dialogues by Sumit Arora) it stars Mohammad Samad, Yash Dholye, Karanvir Malhotra, Rajesh Tailang, Mahesh Manjrekar, Ratna Pathak Shah, Shiv Panditt, Parul Gulati, Amruta Subhash and Akshay Oberoi. The series follows the life of two brothers Radha and Manju who are raised by their cricket obsessed father and meet their rival Javed. The first six episodes of Selection Day premiered on 28 December 2018 on Netflix. Part 2, consisting of another set of six episodes, was premiered on 19 April 2019.

Plot
Radha and Manjunath are two brothers who have been trained by their father to become the next great pair of cricket batsmen. After toying with the bowling attacks of their local village teams, their father decides it is time for them to move to Mumbai and hope to be selected to play in domestic leagues in the upcoming selection season.

Cast
Mohammad Samad as Manju Kumar
Yash Dholye as Radha Kumar
Karanvir Malhotra as Javed Ansari
Rajesh Tailang as Mohan Kumar
Mahesh Manjrekar as Tommy Sir 
Ratna Pathak Shah as Nellie 
Shiv Panditt as Lord Subramanyam
Akshay Oberoi as Anand Mehta
Vipashyana Dubey as Zoya
Parul Gulati as Monica Tandon
Dibyendu Bhattacharya as Gulshan
Pakhi Gupta as Sophia
Amruta Subhash as Meera
Hirdeyjeet Jarnail Singh as Panther's Coach

Episodes

Marketing
The series was announced in August 2017. A 16-second teaser was released on 8 October 2018.

References

External links
 

Hindi-language Netflix original programming
2018 Indian television series debuts
Indian drama television series
Indian teen drama television series
Television shows set in Madhya Pradesh
Television shows based on Indian novels
Indian television series distributed by Netflix
Indian sports television series
Cricket on television
Television series about brothers
Television series about teenagers